R363 road may refer to:
 R363 road (Ireland)
 R363 road (South Africa)